KTGA (99.3 FM) is a radio station licensed to Saratoga, Wyoming, United States. The station is owned by Toga Radio LLC and carries a classic rock format.

References

External links

TGA
Classic rock radio stations in the United States